Lisa Parry is a playwright, based in Cardiff. Her work has been staged by leading new writing companies in the UK and USA. She has been shortlisted for various awards, including Theatre Uncut's Political Playwriting Award.

Career in theatre
Parry studied playwriting at the University of Birmingham and read English Language and Literature at Exeter College, Oxford. In 2011, she co-founded Agent 160 Theatre Company and co-produced two of its shows: a run of short plays by female playwrights in Cardiff, London and Glasgow, and also a series of female monologues at Wales Millennium Centre. The company was set up in response to the statistic that only 17 per cent of plays across the UK are written by women. The company closed in 2014.

In 2016, Parry co-founded Illumine Theatre Company with director Zoë Waterman. The company's first productionof Parry's play 2023opened to rave reviews in October 2018. Wales Arts Review described it as "wonderfully written...it tackles a sensitive topic with intelligence and creativity. It is funny without being too light, and emotive without being too heavy." Art Scene in Wales called it "a truly thought-provoking piece... It is certainly a play that will stay with its audience far after its end". Buzz Magazine described the piece as "a morality tale for the Black Mirror generation", and Get the Chance described it as "[a] stunning new play... Lisa Parry's script is crisp and lucid. I propose that it is in the running for best Welsh play of 2018".

Among the companies that have staged Parry's work are: Dirty Protest, The Miniaturists, PopUp Theatrics and The Sherman. Her work has been produced at: The Barbican, The Other Room, The Sherman, Wales Millennium Centre, Chapter Arts, Theatre 503, The Arcola, TACT Studio (Broadway, NYC), The Arches, Bridewell Theatre London, Martin E Segal Theatre (NYC). In 2019, it was announced that Parry's The Merthyr Stigmatist will be staged at the Sherman in Cardiff in 2020 as part of artistic director Joe Murphy's first season, as a co-production with Theatre Uncut. It has been called one of "the theatre shows you won't want to miss" by BBC News and praised as "surely 2020's best premise for a play". Parry is also one of Theatr Clwyd's writers in residence for 2020.

Speaking and writing
Parry has also worked as a news journalist, her work appearing in regional and national publications; however, she left because she "couldn't shake off the fact I wasn't telling stories in the way I wanted to. They felt constrained inside a formula". She has however continued to contribute to various online and print journals and has also written for the Guardian and contributed to BBC Radio 4, discussing the arts scene in Wales. Parry has also spoken extensively on various panels regarding feminism and theatre and also science and theatre, notably giving a talk for TEDx in Cardiff. In 2019 and 2020, Parry was named as one of Wales Arts Review's 100 Women of Wales on Twitter.

References

External links

Illumine Theatre Company
TEDx talk on YouTube

Living people
British poets
21st-century British dramatists and playwrights
Year of birth missing (living people)
Place of birth missing (living people)